Bronowo Kmiece  is a village in the administrative district of Gmina Stara Biała, within Płock County, Masovian Voivodeship, in east-central Poland.

Bronowo Kmiece is located at 52°37'29?N 19°42'00?E, and has a post code of 09-411. 
The population of the village at the 2011 census was 135

References

Bronowo Kmiece